Nalbari College is in Nalbari, Assam, India. It was founded in 1945. The college is affiliated to Gauhati University and recognized by University Grants Commission (UGC).

Since its inception, the institution imparts higher education to the economically backward people of this locality, especially those belonging to Scheduled Castes and Scheduled Tribes communities.

History

Departments

Arts 
Assamese
Economics
Education
English 
Geography
History
Logic and Philosophy
Political Science
Sanskrit

Science 
Physics
Chemistry
Zoology
Botany
Mathematics
Geology
Computer Science
Statistics
Physical Education

References

External links
 

Universities and colleges in Assam
Gauhati University
Nalbari
Educational institutions established in 1945
1945 establishments in India
Colleges affiliated to Gauhati University